The Moog Sub 37 is a limited edition monophonic analog synthesizer manufactured by Moog Music from 2014. The synthesizer has an analog signal path and digital modulators.  In May 2017, Moog announced its successor, the Moog Subsequent 37 CV, which featured an additional four assignable CV outputs, and two gate output in a limited edition of 2000 units.

In August 2017, Moog announced the successor to the now discontinued Sub 37, the Moog Subsequent 37, which includes many of the features of the limited edition Subsequent 37 CV including a new key bed and increased headroom but does not include the four assignable CV outputs and two gate output.

References

External links
 Sub 37 from Moog Music site
 Moog Announcing the Subsequent 37 CV
 Moog Announcing the Subsequent 37 from Moog Music site

Moog synthesizers
Analog synthesizers
Monophonic synthesizers